Volney Ralph "Skeets" Quinlan, Jr (June 22, 1928January 18, 1998) was an American football halfback in the National Football League. He played  five seasons for the Los Angeles Rams (1952–1956) and the Cleveland Browns (1956). Quinlan was one of the first star running backs to emerge from Texas.   

1928 births
1998 deaths
People from San Angelo, Texas
Players of American football from Texas
American football halfbacks
San Diego State Aztecs football players
Los Angeles Rams players
Cleveland Browns players
Western Conference Pro Bowl players